Vivaldi is a freeware, cross-platform web browser developed by Vivaldi Technologies, a company founded by Tatsuki Tomita and Jon Stephenson von Tetzchner, who was the co-founder and CEO of Opera Software. Vivaldi was officially launched on April 6, 2016.

Although intended for general users, it is first and foremost targeted towards technically-inclined users as well as former Opera users disgruntled by its transition from the Presto layout engine to a Chromium-based browser that resulted in the loss of many of its iconic features. Despite also being Chromium-based, Vivaldi aims to revive the features of the Presto-based Opera with its own proprietary modifications.

Vivaldi released a mobile (Android) beta version on September 6, 2019, and a regular release on April 22, 2020.

As of September 2021, Vivaldi has more than 2.3 million active users.

History
Vivaldi began as a virtual community website that replaced My Opera, which was shut down by Opera Software in March 2014. Jon Stephenson von Tetzchner was angered by this decision because he believed that this community helped make the Opera web browser what it was. Tetzchner then launched the Vivaldi Community—a virtual community focused on providing registered users with a discussion forum, blogging service, and numerous other practical web services—to make up for My Opera's closure. Later, on January 27, 2015, Vivaldi Technologies launched the first technical preview of the Vivaldi web browser. Its name comes from the Italian composer Antonio Vivaldi, which, according to one of its creators, is an easy name to be remembered and understood worldwide.

In September 2021, Vivaldi replaced Firefox as the default browser on the Manjaro Cinnamon Community Edition, the decision its developers cited on its feature-richness and exceptional customizability. In December 2021, Vivaldi became the first web browser to be available for the Android Automotive operating system used in the Swedish electric vehicle manufacturer Polestar's Polestar 2. For safety purposes, the browser can only be used when the car is parked.

Releases

Features

Vivaldi has a minimalistic user interface with basic icons and fonts, and, optionally, a color scheme that changes based on the background and design of the web page being visited. The browser also allows users to customize the appearance of UI elements such as background color, overall theme, address bar and tab positioning, and start pages. According to CEO Jon von Tetzchner, Vivaldi's unique customizability is how the browser caters to experienced users.

Vivaldi comes with built-in ad blocker, pop up blocker and tracker blocker. These features block intrusive ads, help web pages load faster, and protect against malicious ads and trackers. It comes with built-in e-mail client with IMAP and POP3 support. Some of the Mail features are saved searches and offline message search. The browser can be used as a feed reader to save RSS and Atom feeds. It also comes with built-in Vivaldi Calendar to manage events in the browser. Vivaldi Translate is powered by Lingvanex and can instantly translate websites, without the need for third-party extensions.

Vivaldi features the ability to "stack" and "tile" tabs, annotate web pages, and add notes to bookmarks. Furthermore, users can place digital bookmarks on a "speed dial" page for quick access and harness "quick commands" to search bookmarks, browsing history, open tabs, and settings. Vivaldi is built around and based on web technologies such as HTML5, Node.js, React.js, and numerous NPM modules. As of Technical Preview 4, Vivaldi also supports numerous mouse gestures for actions like tab switching and keyboard activation. Vivaldi can also be set to a "Chromeless UI", which gives users more screen real-estate and the ability to focus on a single page without distractions. To accommodate users who prefer to use a large number of tabs at the same time, Vivaldi supports hibernation for both individual tabs and for tab stacks, freeing resources while the user does not actively use those tabs.

Extensions
Vivaldi can use many browser extensions developed for Google Chrome and Firefox (they use common WebExtensions API), and users can install extensions directly from the Chrome Web Store. Most of these work properly in Vivaldi, with the exception of user interface customizations due to its visual changes to the Chromium source code.

Market share

Starting with version 2.10, Vivaldi changed its user agent string to mimic a generic build of Chromium, which results in it not being recorded as a unique browser and causing a decrease in its recorded market share.

Reception

Ars Technica reviewer Scott Gilbertson wrote about version 1.0 in April 2016. He praised its innovative features, such as its tab handling, while noting that it will most likely remain a niche browser and not see widespread uptake. In October 2018, Gilbertson gave version 2.0 a very positive review and stated that Vivaldi is now his usual browser and that he would be hard put to go back to a browser without its unique features.

Ghacks editor-in-chief Martin Brinkmann wrote about the privacy of Vivaldi in January 2018. He criticized the lack of an opt-out option for the unique user ID it generates to get general statistics about the browser's userbase, but commented that the unique ID "is easy enough to delete" and "it is different anyway if you use Vivaldi on multiple devices".

Notes

References

External links
 

2015 software
Android web browsers
Cross-platform web browsers
Email client software for Linux
Email clients that use GTK
Freeware
Linux web browsers
macOS email clients
macOS web browsers
Windows email clients
Windows web browsers
Web browsers that use GTK